The Douglas F3D Skyknight (later designated F-10 Skyknight) is an American twin-engined, mid-wing jet fighter aircraft manufactured by the Douglas Aircraft Company in El Segundo, California. The F3D was designed as a carrier-based all-weather night fighter and saw service with the United States Navy and United States Marine Corps. The mission of the F3D was to search out and destroy enemy aircraft at night.

The F3D Skyknight was never produced in great numbers but it did achieve many firsts in its role as a night fighter over Korea. While it never achieved the fame of the North American F-86 Sabre, it did down several Soviet-built MiG-15s as a night fighter over Korea with only one air-to-air loss, against a Chinese MiG-15, which occurred on the night of 29 May 1953.

The Skyknight played an important role in the development of the radar-guided AIM-7 Sparrow missile, which led to further guided air-to-air missile developments. It also served as an electronic warfare platform in the Vietnam War as a precursor to the EA-6A Intruder and EA-6B Prowler. The aircraft is sometimes unofficially called "Skynight", dropping the second "k". The unusual, portly profile earned it the nickname "Willie the Whale". Some Vietnam War U.S. Marine veterans have referred to the Skyknight as "Drut", whose meaning becomes obvious when read backwards. This may be in reference to its age, unflattering looks, or the low-slung air intakes that made it vulnerable to foreign object damage (FOD).

Design and development
The F3D was not intended to be a typical sleek and nimble dogfighter, but as a standoff night fighter, packing a powerful radar system and a second crew member. It originated in 1945 with a US Navy requirement for a jet-powered, radar-equipped, carrier-based night fighter. The Douglas team led by Ed Heinemann designed around the bulky air intercept radar systems of the time, with side-by-side seating for the pilot and radar operator. The result was an aircraft with a wide, deep, and roomy fuselage. Instead of ejection seats, an escape tunnel was used, similar to the type used in the Douglas A-3 Skywarrior.

The XF3D-1 beat out Grumman Aircraft Engineering Corporation's G-75 two-seat, four-engined, Westinghouse J30-powered night fighter design (similar layout to their Tigercat), and a contract was issued on 3 April 1946. The US Navy's Bureau of Aeronautics (BuAer) also issued a contract to Grumman for two G-75 (BuAer designation XF9F-1) experimental aircraft on 11 April 1946 in case the Skyknight ran into problems. Grumman soon realized that the G-75 was a losing design but had been working on a completely different, single-engined day fighter known as the Grumman G-79 which became the Grumman F9F Panther.

The first flight of the XF3D-1 was on 23 March 1948 at Douglas' El Segundo facility with test pilot Russell Thaw at the controls. Further flight testing followed at El Segundo until October 1948. Three prototypes were then taken to Muroc Air Force Base (later renamed Edwards Air Force Base) for service trials. These units were powered by two Westinghouse J34-WE-24 turbojets of  thrust, mounted under the roots of then-standard straight wings of the early jet era. A production contract for 28 F3D-1 J34-WE-32 powered production aircraft was issued in June 1948 with the first production aircraft flying on 13 February 1950.

As a night fighter that was not expected to be as fast as smaller daylight fighters, the expectation was to have a stable platform for its radar system and the four 20 mm cannon mounted in the lower fuselage. The F3D was, however, able to outturn a MiG-15. The fire control system in the F3D-1 was the Westinghouse AN/APQ-35. The AN/APQ-35 was advanced for the time, a combination of three different radars, each performing separate functions: an AN/APS-21 search radar, an AN/APG-26 tracking radar, both located in the nose, and an AN/APS-28 tail warning radar. The complexity of this vacuum tube-based radar system, which was produced before the advent of semiconductor electronics, required intensive maintenance to keep it operating properly.

The F3D-1 was followed by the F3D-2, which was first ordered in August 1949. The F3D-2 was intended to have Westinghouse J46 engines in enlarged nacelles to replace the J34-WE-32 engines of the F3D-1, but because of development problems with the J46, the F3D-2 was initially fitted with J34-WE-36 engines instead. Higher-thrust J34-WE-38 engines which increased aircraft performance were installed later. The F3D-2 also incorporated an improved Westinghouse AN/APQ-36 fire control system. A total of 237 F3D-2s were built before production ended on 23 March 1952. A higher performance F3D-3 version with swept wings and J46 engines was planned, but was cancelled when the trouble-plagued J46 engine program was terminated.

Operational history

Korean War
The 28 F3D-1 aircraft were used primarily to train F3D crews and did not see combat in the Korean War. The F3D-2 Skyknight was only deployed to Korea by USMC land–based squadrons, beginning in September 1952. The Skyknight downed more enemy aircraft in Korea than any other single type of naval aircraft. The first air-to-air victory occurred on the night of 2 November 1952 in a USMC F3D-2 piloted by Major William T. Stratton Jr., and his radar operator, Master Sergeant Hans C. Hoglind of VMF(N)-513 Flying Nightmares, Major Stratton shot down what he believed was a Yakovlev Yak-15 (even though no Yak-15s were reported in Korea) which was the first successful night radar interception by a jet of a jet. The Skyknight claimed its first MiG-15 jet fighter on 8 November 1952, when Captain O.R. Davis and Warrant Officer D.F. "Ding" Fessler downed a MiG-15 northwest of Pyongyang. USMC pilot Lt. Joseph Corvi and his radar operator Sergeant Dan George set another record with the Skyknight on the night of 10 December 1952, when they downed the first aircraft by an aircraft with a radar track and lock-on and without visual contact; they performed the feat by using their radar to lock onto a Polikarpov Po-2 biplane. They were also credited with another probable kill that night.

The number of USMC Skyknights in Korea was doubled in January 1953 to 24 which allowed them to effectively escort B-29 Superfortresses on night bombing missions. On 12 January 1953, an F3D-2 of VMF(N)-513 that was escorting B-29s on a night bombing mission was vectored to a contact and shot down the fourth aircraft by a Skyknight. By the end of the war, Skyknights had claimed six enemy aircraft (one Polikarpov Po-2, one Yakovlev Yak-15 and four MiG-15s). One aircraft was lost to enemy fire, which was piloted by LTJG Bob Bick and his crewman, Chief Petty Officer Linton Smith, on 2 July 1953. This aircraft was with a detachment from Fleet Composite Squadron FOUR (VC-4) at NAS Atlantic City, and was attached to Marine Fighter Squadron 513 (VMF(N)-513). While the Skyknight lacked the swept wings and high subsonic performance of the MiG-15, its powerful fire control system enabled it to find and shoot down other fighters at night, while most MiG-15s could only be guided by ground-based radar.

Post Korean War

After the Korean War, the F3D was gradually replaced by more powerful aircraft with better radar systems. Its career was not over though; its stability and spacious fuselage made it easily adaptable to other roles. The F3D (under the designations F3D-1M and F3D-2M) was used to support development of a number of air-to-air missile systems during the 1950s, including the Sparrow I, II, and III and Meteor missiles. The Sparrow missile was developed at Pacific Missile Test Center and early test firings were conducted at Naval Ordnance Test Station China Lake.

In 1954, the F3D-2M was the first Navy jet aircraft to be fitted with an operational air-to-air missile: the Sparrow I, an all weather day/night beyond-visual-range missile that used beam riding guidance for the aircrew to control the missile's track. Only 28 aircraft (12 F3D-1Ms, and 16 F3D-2Ms) were modified to use the missiles.

In the late 1950s, a number of the Marine F3D-2 aircraft were re-configured as electronic warfare aircraft and were designated F3D-2Q (later EF-10B). A few aircraft were also converted for use as trainers and were designated  F3D-2T. Some of these aircraft were fitted with a single 10" aerial reconnaissance photography camera, which was mounted in the tail section.

In 1959, Ed Heinemann proposed that Douglas refurbish retired F3Ds for civil use, envisioning that former military aircraft could be offered at a much lower price than newly designed business jets such as Lockheed JetStar; however, the project was canceled due to the generally poor condition of aircraft then in storage.

When the U.S. Navy issued a requirement for a fleet defense missile fighter in 1959, Douglas responded with the F6D Missileer, essentially an updated and enlarged F3D that would carry the AAM-N-10 Eagle long-range air-to-air missile, with the most important characteristics being its generous fuel capacity, its considerable time-on-station, a crew of two and sophisticated electronics, rather than speed or maneuverability. This concept which kept the straight wings in an age of supersonic jets was soon cancelled because it would not be able to defend itself against more nimble fighters. The supersonic General Dynamics-Grumman F-111B was subsequently developed to carry long-range missiles, only to be cancelled due to excessive weight and changing tactical requirements; the Grumman F-14 Tomcat would later enter service in this role.

Skyknights continued in service through the 1960s in a gull white color scheme, when their contemporaries had long since been retired. In 1962, when the U.S. Navy and U.S. Air Force unified their designation systems, the F3D-1 was redesignated F-10A and the F3D-2 was re-designated F-10B.

Vietnam War 

The Skyknight was the only Korean War jet fighter that also flew in Vietnam. EF-10Bs served in the Electronic warfare role during the Vietnam War until 1969. The large interior provided ample room for electronic equipment. U.S. Marine Marine Composite Reconnaissance Squadron One (VMCJ-1) Golden Hawks began operating the EF-10B on 17 April 1965 under Lt. Col Wes Corman at Da Nang Air Base Republic of Vietnam with six aircraft. No more than 10 EF-10Bs were in Vietnam at one time. The Electronic Warfare (EW) Skyknight was a valuable Electronic countermeasure (ECM) asset to jam the SA-2 surface-to-air missiles (SAM) tracking and guidance systems. VMCJ-1 made history when its EF-10Bs conducted the first USMC airborne radar jamming mission on 29 April 1965 to support a USAF strike mission. Four EF-10Bs also supported a massive strike on the SAM sites near Hanoi on 27 July 1965.

Many U.S. aircraft were lost to SA-2s in Vietnam and the electronic attack on the associated radar systems was known as "Fogbound" missions. The F3D also dropped chaff over the radar sites. The first EF-10B lost in Vietnam was to an SA-2 on 18 March 1966, while four more EF-10Bs were lost in Vietnam to accidents and unknown causes. Their mission was gradually taken over by the more capable EA-6A "Electric Intruder", an Electronic Warfare/Electronic Countermeasures (EW/ECM) variant of the Grumman A-6 Intruder attack bomber. The EF-10B Skyknight continued to fly lower–threat EW missions until they were withdrawn from South Vietnam in October 1969. The U.S. Navy's EKA-3 Skywarrior and the USAF's Douglas RB-66 Destroyer also took on EW missions.

The U.S. Marine Corps retired its last EF-10Bs in May 1970.

Post Vietnam
The U.S. Navy continued to use the F-10s for avionics systems testing. The F-10 was used as a radar testbed to develop the APQ-72 radar. The nose of an F-4 Phantom was added to the front of an F-10B. Another F-10 had a modified radome installed by the radar manufacturer Westinghouse. Yet another TF-10B was modified with the nose from an A-4 Skyhawk. In 1968, three Skyknights were transferred to the U.S. Army. These aircraft were operated by the Raytheon Corporation at Holloman AFB where they were used testing at the White Sands Missile Range into the 1980s; they were the last flyable Skyknights.

Variants

XF3D-1
F3D-1
First flight: 13 February 1950.
F3D-1M
12 F3D-1s were converted into missile-armed test aircraft, used in the development of the AIM-7 Sparrow air-to-air missile.
F3D-2
First flight: 14 February 1951.
F3D-2B
One F3D-1 was used for special armament test in 1952.
F3D-2M
16 F3D-2s were converted into missile armed aircraft. The F3D-2Ms were armed with AIM-7 Sparrow air-to-air missiles.
F3D-2Q
35 F3D-2s were converted into electronic warfare aircraft.
F3D-2T
Five F3D-2s were converted into night fighter training aircraft.
F3D-2T2
55 F3D-2s were used as radar-operator trainers and electronic warfare aircraft.
F3D-3
Unbuilt project, intended to be an advanced version incorporating swept wings.

F-10A
1962 re-designation of the F3D-1.
F-10B
1962 re-designation of the F3D-2.
EF-10B
1962 re-designation of the F3D-2Q.
MF-10A
1962 re-designation of the F3D-1M.
MF-10B
1962 re-designation of the F3D-2M.
TF-10B
1962 re-designation of the F3D-2T2.

Operators

United States Army
United States Marine Corps
United States Navy

Aircraft on display
F3D-2
BuNo 124598 – National Museum of Naval Aviation at NAS Pensacola, Florida.
BuNo 124629 – Pima Air & Space Museum adjacent to Davis-Monthan AFB in Tucson, Arizona.
BuNo 124630 – Flying Leatherneck Aviation Museum at MCAS Miramar, California.
BuNo 125807 – Combat Air Museum in Topeka, Kansas.
BuNo 125870, (repainted as BuNo 127039) – Korean War and Vietnam War memorial in Del Valle Park in Lakewood, California. Originally displayed in 1950s-era dark blue coloring, the aircraft was repainted in 1963 to the grey and white color scheme of Marine Corps aircraft at the time. With this repainting, the aircraft had the tail code "7L," which was the 1960s-era tail code for Marine Corps Air Reserve and Naval Air Reserve aircraft at nearby Naval Air Station Los Alamitos, California. In 2015, the aircraft was refurbished and painted in grey and white to depict a late 1950s-era Skyknight of VMFT(N)-20 with tail code "BP." 
F3D-2Q
BuNo 124618 – National Museum of the Marine Corps, in Quantico, Virginia.
BuNo 124620 – Quonset Air Museum at Quonset State Airport (former NAS Quonset Point) in Quonset Point, Rhode Island.
BuNo 125850 – Air Force Flight Test Center Museum at Edwards AFB, California. This aircraft served until 1970 as part of VMCJ-3 (U.S. Marine Composite Reconnaissance Squadron 3) based at Marine Corps Air Station El Toro, California, carrying tail code "TN."
F3D-2T
BuNo 127074 – Empire State Aerosciences Museum (ESAM) near Schenectady, New York. This F3D was operated by Raytheon in Massachusetts for electronics tests until it was donated to the Intrepid Sea-Air-Space Museum in New York City, New York. It was displayed at the museum from 1987 until April 2012, when it was one of three aircraft moved to the ESAM to make room for the Space Shuttle Enterprise. It is painted in the livery of U.S. Marine Night Fighter Squadron 513 (VMF(N)-513) as flown during the Korean War.

Specifications (F3D-2)

See also

References

Notes

Citations

Bibliography

 Andrade, John M. U.S. Military Aircraft Designations and Serials since 1909. Earl Shilton, Leicester, UK: Midland Counties Publications, 1979, 
 Badrocke, Mike. "Electronic Warrior". Air Enthusiast, Fifty-one, August to October 1993, pp. 41–48. Stamford, UK: Key Publishing. ISSN 0143-5450
 Donald, David, ed. The Encyclopedia of World Aircraft. London: Aerospace Publishing, 1997. 
 Dorr, Robert F. and Warren Thompson. Korean Air War. St. Paul, Minnesota: Motorbooks International, 1994.
 Francillon, René. McDonnell Douglas Aircraft Since 1920. London: Putnam, 1979. 
 Gunston, Bill, ed. The Illustrated History of Fighters. New York, New York: Exeter Books Division of Simon & Schuster, 1981. 
 Grossnick, Roy A. and William J. Armstrong.  United States Naval Aviation, 1910–1995. Annapolis, Maryland: Naval Historical Center, 1997. 
 Hardy, Michael John. Sea, Sky and Stars: An Illustrated History of Grumman Aircraft. London: Arms & Armour Press, 1987. 
 Heinemann, Edward H. and Rosario Rausa. Ed Heinemann: Combat Aircraft Designer. Annapolis, Maryland: Naval Institute Press, 1980. 
 The Illustrated Encyclopedia of Aircraft (Part Work 1982–1985). London: Orbis Publishing, 1985
 Jones, Lloyd. U.S. Fighters: Army-Air Force 1925 to 1980s. Fallbrook, California: Aero Publishers, 1975. 
 Jones, Lloyd. U.S. Naval Fighters: 1922 to 1980s. Fallbrook, California: Aero Publishers, 1977. 
 Sullivan, Jim. F9F Panther/Cougar in action. Carrollton, TX: Squadron/Signal Publications, 1982. 
 Swanborough, Gordon and Peter M. Bowers. United States Navy Aircraft since 1911. London: Putnam, Second edition, 1976.

External links

Boeing "McDonnell Douglas History, Skyknight, F3D (F-10)"
GlobalSecurity "F3D (F-10) Skyknight"
"US Navy BuNo 125807 on display" at Combat Air Museum

F3D Skyknight
Douglas FD3 Skyknight
Twinjets
Carrier-based aircraft
Mid-wing aircraft
Aircraft first flown in 1948